Grande Ecaille is an island located in the parish of Plaquemines, Louisiana, United States. It is in Lake Grand Ecaille. It was the site of a sulphur factory operated by Freeport Sulphur Company built in 1933.

Geography

References

 
Unincorporated communities in New Orleans metropolitan area
Unincorporated communities in Louisiana